Kadhalan is a 1994 Indian Tamil-language romantic thriller film written and directed by S. Shankar and produced by K. T. Kunjumon. The film stars Prabhu Deva and Nagma (in her major Tamil cinema debut), while Vadivelu, Raghuvaran, Girish Karnad, and S. P. Balasubrahmanyam play supporting roles. It focuses on a college student who falls in love with the state governor's daughter. The governor opposes this, and unknown to anyone, plans on toppling the state government.

Kunjumon decided to collaborate with Shankar for the second time after the success of Gentleman (1993), and the story Shankar developed was that of a romance between an ordinary man and a wealthy girl; to increase the scale of the project, Kunjumon incorporated the cold-war between the then Tamil Nadu chief minister J. Jayalalithaa and the then governor Marri Chenna Reddy into the screenplay. The dialogues were written by Balakumaran, cinematography was handled by Jeeva, and editing by B. Lenin and V. T. Vijayan.

Kadhalan was released on 17 September 1994. The film was a major commercial success and won many recognitions and honours, including two South Filmfare Awards, and four National Film Awards.

Plot 
Kakarla Sathyanarayana, the governor of Tamil Nadu, is to open a new open market in Madras. A terrorist plants a bomb in the preceding night of the opening, and the market area explodes minutes after Kakarla leaves the ceremony. The state government is thrown into disarray.

Prabhu is the student chairman of the Government Arts College and his friend Vasanth is the joint secretary. He goes to invite Kakarla as the chief guest for the college annual day along with Vasanth, during which he sees his daughter Shruti and instantly falls in love with her. Kakarla accepts the invitation and on the function day he arrives with his wife and Shruti; Prabhu is excited to see her again. To get close to Shruti, Prabhu joins her dance school. Shruti initially hates him for disrespecting classical dance. Prabhu's father, police constable Kathiresan, advises him to impress her by learning classical dance properly and Prabhu assents. Prabhu practices day and night for a month and becomes well versed in the art. Shruti refuses to go to the Natyanjali festival at Chidambaram if Prabhu attends, for fear of him insulting the art. To disprove her, Prabhu secretly enters her house and demonstrates his dance skills to her. She is amazed and agrees to go but, due to fear of terrorism, Kakarla refuses to let her leave.

Unknown to anyone, Kakarla is an aide of the National ruling party. He was paid heavily to topple the state government by horse-trading of MLAs; he instead chose to create law and order disarray and dismiss the legislature using Article 356 of the Constitution of India. He was the one who planned the bomb at the market. Shruti escapes with Prabhu and Vasanth via motorbike, outwitting her bodyguards. Meanwhile, Kakarla and bomb specialist Mallikarjuna plan the next bomb blast at the Nataraja Temple where Natyanjali is to take place. Commander Ajay informs Kakarla that Shruti left with two men to attend Natyanjali. Kakarla orders Malli to remove the bomb, but he faces an accident on the way, resulting in a broken leg. Prabhu and Shruti are chased by the police and Malli; that night they stay in a paddy field. Shruti realises Prabhu's love for her and reciprocates. They reach Chidambaram as planned. Due to Malli's inability to remove the bomb, Kakarla secretly informs the police and his guards. Ajay and the squad reach the temple, remove the bomb and bring Shruti back by helicopter.

Kakarla doubts Shruti's virginity as she was with Prabhu for a night. Upset at this, Shruti meets with Prabhu and asks him to marry her, but then Ajay and his commandos imprison Prabhu and accuse him of planting the bomb. The police order Prabhu to confess, but he refuses while Shruti becomes embittered over his imprisonment, and expresses her love for him to her parents. Vasanth informs all the students about the happenings and a strike is called by all the students against Kakarla. Kakarla is embarrassed by Sruthi in an official dinner party, and they make a deal. In exchange for Prabhu's unconditional release, Shruti is sent to her paternal grandparents' house in Tadepalligudem, Andhra Pradesh. Weeks later, Prabhu and Vasanth reach Tadepalligudem and find Shruti. Her grandparents support their romance and unite them. Malli sees Prabhu and informs Kakarla over a wireless transmission which Prabhu overhears. He discovers evidence of Kakarla's attempts to blast Nataraja Temple, and learns of his plans of blasting the Government General Hospital. After subduing Malli, Prabhu and Vasanth escape with the evidence.

Malli informs Kakarla, who orders the police to find Prabhu. Police arrest Prabhu and Vasanth, and Kakarla tells Malli to make the bomb detonate after his visit to the hospital to see the Vice President of India undergoing treatment there. They plan to dump unconscious Prabhu and Vasanth in the hospital. However, the duo escape, and Prabhu informs Kathiresan about the bomb. Malli plants the bomb, but Kakarla betrays him by trying to kill him with a bomb radio. Malli survives, and in revenge re-times the bomb to detonate during Kakarla's scheduled visit. Prabhu searches for the bomb, while Vasanth brings students to vacate the patients. After meeting the Vice President, Kakarla gets stuck in a lift with his wife and daughter. Shruti is helped out, while Prabhu, having located the bomb, runs to a river and throws it there; the bomb detonates without killing anyone. Malli manages to kill Kakarla with a live wire, and succumbs to his injuries. Prabhu and Shruti reunite.

Cast 
 Prabhu Deva as Prabhu
 Nagma as Shruthi
 Vadivelu as Kaliyaperumal aka Vasanth
 S. P. Balasubrahmanyam as Kathiresan
 Raghuvaran as Mallikarjuna "Malli"
 Manorama as Shruthi's grandmother
 Girish Karnad as Kakarla Sathyanarayana
 Allu Ramalingaiah as Shruthi's grandfather
 Ajay Rathnam as Ajay

 Padmapriya as Prabhu's mother
 Kavitrasri as the policewoman
 S. Shankar in a cameo appearance ("Kadhalikum Pennin" song)
 Raju Sundaram in a cameo appearance ("Kadhalikum Pennin" song)

Production

Development 
After the success of Gentleman (1993), producer K. T. Kunjumon of A. R. S. Film International decided to collaborate with director S. Shankar for the second time. Shankar narrated the plot of "a young dancer from a normal middle-class household falling in love with a girl from a very influential household". Kunjumon liked the plot and, "to turn this into as grand a film as was possible", he decided to incorporate the cold-war between the then Tamil Nadu chief minister J. Jayalalithaa and the then governor Marri Chenna Reddy into the screenplay. The dialogues were written by Balakumaran, cinematography was handled by Jeeva, and editing by B. Lenin and V. T. Vijayan.

Casting 
Shankar wanted Prashanth to be the lead actor, but due to other commitments he could not act in the film. Prabhu Deva, who worked as a dancer for Kunjumon's previous ventures, was later finalised by Kunjumon. Shankar was initially reluctant to have him as the lead actor as distributors felt audience would not accept him in that role because of his "lean physique" and "bearded look". However Kunjumon was firm with his choice and wanted to prove distributors wrong. Dubbing voice for Prabhu Deva was provided by the then struggling actor Vikram. Madhuri Dixit was originally considered as the lead actress. Busy schedules meant that Nagma was instead chosen. It is her first Tamil film. Kunjumon initially wanted to have Goundamani play Vasanth, but he did not accept, citing scheduling conflicts; Vadivelu was instead chosen. Girish Karnad was not initially interested in playing the governor, but after convincing by Kunjumon, he agreed.

Filming 
The song "Urvasi Urvasi" was shot near the SPIC building in Guindy and other landmarks across Madras. Art director Thota Tharani specially created a glass framed bus for the song. Since the crew made a film with a relatively new cast it created doubts on the trade, so the crew decided "to use the newest technology at that time to make the film appealing to audiences. They decided to go all out with visual effects in the songs, making them the attraction." S. T. Venky was chosen to handle the visual effects for the film and he had done by outsourcing the work to technicians from abroad. It became the final film to be shot inside the temple premises of Nataraja Temple after the film's crew was sued by court for shooting inside the temple. The filming took eleven months to be completed.

Music 

The score and soundtrack were composed by A. R. Rahman. with lyrics written by Vaali, Vairamuthu and director Shankar who penned the "Pettai Rap" number. The song "Mukkabla" became popular and was plagiarised freely by tunesmiths. Nearly a dozen versions of the song were churned out, a feat that earned "Mukkabla" and Rahman a place in the Limca Book of Records. New styles were experimented with, as in the song "Pettai Rap", a Madras Bashai song which was written in a rap-like style, interspersing Tamil with English words. The synthesiser and the keyboard also feature while drawing from Tamil folk music. P. Unnikrishnan made his playback singing debut with the song "Ennavale Ennavale" which is set in Kedaram raga.

The dubbed Hindi version of the soundtrack, Humse Hai Muqabala, sold 2.5 million units in India. "Urvasi Urvasi" inspired the 2014 song "It's My Birthday" by American rapper will.i.am. It was remade in Hindi as a single, "Urvashi" in 2018, sung and composed by Yo Yo Honey Singh, with the music video starring Shahid Kapoor and Kiara Advani. "Mukkabla" was remade as "Muqabla" in Hindi for the 2020 film Street Dancer 3D, in which Prabhu Deva stars as one of the leads, and an accompanying video song was released in late 2019 as promotion for the film.

Release 
Kadhalan was released on 17 September 1994.

Reception 
Malini Mannath of The Indian Express said, "[Kadhalan] is better than expected, and will appeal to the college crowd." K. Vijiyan of New Straits Times said, "Sadly, the love story is not all that endearing as it is eclipsed by the dance songs." Balaji T.K. of INDOlink wrote, "With a tighter script and more attention to the story's development instead of gimmicks like computer Graphics and having S.P.B. cavort in drag for song, this would have made a great entertainer. Still the songs and picturization makes this worthwhile". R. P. R. of Kalki praised the film for its grandeur, but criticised its story and Prabhu Deva's performance for being overshadowed by his dancing.

Accolades 
P. Unnikrishnan won the National Film Award for Best Male Playback Singer with his first ever film song for "Ennavale Ennavale".

Controversy 
Congress MP Era. Anbarasu submitted a petition to the Madras High Court to ban the film, citing the negative portrayal of the governor; the High Court admitted the petition. Kunjumon said he received calls from governor's office ordering him to remove certain scenes from the film. However, Jayalalithaa was impressed with the film, supported Kunjumon and no scenes were removed.

Legacy 
The song "Urvasi Urvasi" inspired the title of the 1996 film Take It Easy Urvashi. Furthermore, the gibberish line "Jil Jung Juk" which was spoken by Vadivelu in the film inspired the title of a 2016 film.

References

Bibliography

External links 
 

1990s political thriller films
1990s romantic thriller films
1990s Tamil-language films
1994 films
Films about contract killing in India
Films about terrorism in India
Films directed by S. Shankar
Films scored by A. R. Rahman
Films set in Andhra Pradesh
Films set in Chennai
Films set in universities and colleges
Films set in Uttar Pradesh
Films shot in Puducherry
Films shot in Uttar Pradesh
Films that won the Best Audiography National Film Award
Films that won the Best Special Effects National Film Award
Films whose editor won the Best Film Editing National Award
Indian films with live action and animation
Indian political thriller films
Indian romantic thriller films